The LaVern Gibson Championship Cross Country Course, in Terre Haute, Indiana was dedicated October 17, 1997. This course has the distinction of being one of the few purpose-built cross-country courses in the world. The facility is part of  that comprise the Wabash Valley Family Sports Center just east of the Terre Haute International Airport. The course itself is built on a reclaimed coal mine and consists of an external loop of 3 km and four internal loops that allow for circuits of varying lengths. Indiana State University's Cross-Country team uses the Gibson Course for its home meets.

In the short history of the course it has hosted multiple championship meets. The Gibson Course hosted the NCAA Division I Great Lakes Regional in 1998, 1999, 2001, and 2003, and Division III Regional in 2009 and 2012. The most prominent meet it has hosted has been the Men's and  Women's NCAA Division I Cross Country Championships (2002, 2004-2011, 2013-2014, 2016, 2019). In 2004 it also became the host site of the state high school championship meet for Indiana, as well as the Nike Cross Nationals (NXN) Midwest Regional Meet in 2009. It has also hosted numerous invitational and conference championship meets on multiple levels since it opened.

Course records

References

External links
Official website

College cross country courses in the United States
Cross country running courses in Indiana
Indiana State Sycamores cross country courses
Sports venues in Indiana
Buildings and structures in Terre Haute, Indiana
Tourist attractions in Terre Haute, Indiana